Alaric Bennedict Basson (born 16 February 1996) is a South African swimmer. He competed in the men's 200 metre breaststroke at the 2019 World Aquatics Championships. His twin brother Alard is also a swimmer.

References

1996 births
Living people
African Games gold medalists for South Africa
African Games medalists in swimming
African Games silver medalists for South Africa
Coloured South African people
Swimmers at the 2015 African Games
Swimmers at the 2019 African Games
Male breaststroke swimmers
South African male freestyle swimmers
People from Uitenhage
South African male swimmers
Sportspeople from the Eastern Cape
21st-century South African people
20th-century South African people